Red Cross, a six-song punk rock EP record, is the first stand-alone release by American rock band Red Cross.

Background
On August 29, 1979, the day after Ron Reyes joined them on drums, replacing Johh Stielow, McDonald brothers' middle school punk rock band, the Tourists, would change their name to "Red Cross". Soon after, on September 6, they would go into a recording studio for the first time, accompanied by Joe Nolte, leader of Los Angeles rock band The Last, who produced their session at Media Art Studio in Hermosa Beach, California. However, when Red Cross signed not long after with Posh Boy Records, its owner, Robbie Fields, didn't like the Nolte recordings, so, he would get most of the songs to be re-recorded .

Only one of the cuts from the Nolte session would be later released. "Rich Brat" was included on the 1982 New Underground Records compilation album Life Is Ugly So Why Not Kill Yourself.

In 1980, six tracks from the Posh Boy recording session were included on The Siren, a sampler LP shared with San Francisco power pop band 391, and Salt Lake City punk rock act Spittin' Teeth. Their participation in this album would be the recorded debut for Red Cross; so, their following release, the Red Cross EP, would be but a stand-alone reissue of those same songs.

Production
All songs on Red Cross were originally recorded with producer and engineer Roger Harris at the Shelter Studios in Hollywood, California on October 1, 1979. The mixing was done at Paradise Studios in Burbank, California.

Release
Red Cross was first released in 1980 on Posh Boy Records, in 12-inch vinyl disc format. The first pressing, without any cover art, came with pinkish-red labels and packaged in a generic, multicolored die-cut record sleeve.

Reissues
In 1981, Red Cross was included, in its entirety, on the rare cassette tape version of the Beach Blvd compilation issued by Posh Boy Records.

By 1985, Red Cross was re-released featuring its own cover art, and disc labels printed in black and red on a silver background. This same edition would be repressed the year after.

A new repressing was released in 1987, featuring disc labels printed in black on a silver background and packaged in a generic record company sleeve as the original release.

In 1987, Posh Boy repackaged The Future Looks Bright, a sampler album originally produced by the label, jointly with SST Records, in 1981. Retitled as The Future Looks Brighter, this edition featured only artists from the Posh Boy roster. The complete Red Cross EP was added to the CD version.

In late 1987, the EP was reissued under the title Annette's Got the Hits, featuring alternate cover art but keeping the same catalog number and the old disc labels from the 1985 re-release.

In 1990, Posh Boy issued the single "Cover Band", bundled with "Burn Out" on its flip side.

In 1991, Annette's Got the Hits was included in the numbered 3-EP box set The Posh E.P.'s Vol. 1, in conjunction with Stepmothers' 1981 EP All Systems Go and an untitled six-track EP featuring Social Distortion's early songs recorded in 1981.

In 2020 a 40th Anniversary edition was reissued by Merge Records with the original rejected Joe Nolte (leader of Los Angeles rock band The Last) session tracks from September 1979 added and one live track recorded in July 1979 by 'The Tourists', the original band name before they changed it to Red Cross in August 1979.

Cover art
The original cover art for Red Cross, informally referred to as "the red cover", shows the band's name on a red background, written, with its original spelling, in uppercase white letters resembling strips of medical tape.

On the cover art for Annette's Got the Hits, a photomontage in sepia, portraying the four band members performing live, is displayed on a dark grey background. The original spelling of the group's name is changed to "Redd Kross".

Re-recordings
After Greg Hetson left Red Cross to join the Circle Jerks in December 1979, a controversial alternate version of his song "Cover Band", reworked with new lyrics by Keith Morris, was featured as "Live Fast Die Young" on his new band's first studio album, Group Sex, released in October 1980 on Frontier Records.

Track listing

Personnel
Red Cross
Jeff McDonald – vocals
Greg Hetson – guitar
Steve McDonald – bass, vocals
Ron Reyes – drums

Production
Robbie Fields – executive in charge of production
Roger Harris – production, engineering

Notes

References

Further reading
Magazines
 Tonooka, Tim (Fall 1981). Red Cross (EP). Ripper (5).
 Yohannan, Tim (November 1985). Red Cross (EP), 1985 reissue. Maximumrocknroll (30).
 Yohannan, Tim (October 1987). Annette's Got the Hits. Maximumrocknroll (53).

External links
 Annette's Got the Hits. Posh Boy Records.

Reviews
 Rabid, Jack. "Annette's Got the Hits: AllMusic Review by Jack Rabid". AllMusic.
 Robbins, Ira; Schinder, Scott. "Redd Kross (Red Cross)". Trouser Press.
 The Flakes (March 11, 2010). "Red Cross – S/T E.P. 12″". Killed by Death Records.

1980 debut EPs
Redd Kross albums